Hiram Higley (March 5, 1804 – January 8, 1860) was an American politician who served one term in the Michigan House of Representatives in its first session after being established.

Biography 

Hiram Higley was born in East Windsor, Connecticut, on March 5, 1804,
the son of Adori Higley and Clarissa Loomis.
He was a tanner by occupation. He settled in Rochester, Michigan, in 1827, and was elected as a Democrat to the Michigan House of Representatives in 1835 following adoption of the state's first constitution.

In 1853, he moved to Leipsic, Ohio, and died there on January 8, 1860.

Notes

References 
 
 
 
 
 

1804 births
1860 deaths
Democratic Party members of the Michigan House of Representatives
19th-century American politicians
People from East Windsor, Connecticut
People from Rochester, Michigan
People from Leipsic, Ohio